Juanjo Giménez Peña (born 18 April 1963) is a Spanish director and filmmaker. He is best known for his films Indirect Free Kick (1997), Rodilla (2009), "Nitbus" (2007), Maximum Penalty (2005) and Timecode that earned him Short Film Palme d'Or at 69th annual Cannes Film Festival and received Academy Award for Best Live Action Short Film nomination at the 89th Academy Awards. He is also the founder of the production companies Nadir Films and Salto de Eje.

Filmography
 2021 - Out of Sync
 2016 - Timecode (Short)  
 2014 - El Arca de Noé (producer) 
 2012 - Los increíbles (producer) 
 2012 - Enxaneta (producer) 
 2012 - Alfred(producer) 
 2010 - Esquivar y pegar (Documentary)  
 2009 - Rodilla: Cromos para ajustar cuentas con la infancia (Short)  
 2007 - Nitbus (Short) (as Juan José Giménez i Peña)  
 2005 - Máxima pena (Short)  
 2001 - Tilt (as Juanjo Giménez)  
 1997 - Indirect Free-Kick (Short)  
 1995 - Ella está enfadada (Short) (as Juanjo Giménez)  
 1995 - Especial (con luz)

Awards and nominations
 Nominated: Academy Award for Best Live Action Short Film 
 Won: Goya Award for Best Fictional Short Film 
 Won: Short Film Palme d'Or

References

External links
 
 

1963 births
Living people
Spanish film directors
Spanish film producers
21st-century Spanish screenwriters